Cross Island, locally known as Chinal Tekdi, meaning hill of prostitutes, is an uninhabited or sparsely inhabited island located in Mumbai harbour, India, between the coast at Dockyard Road, and Elephanta Island, about 400 m from Ferry Wharf on the east coast of Mumbai. The island is host to an oil refinery and several large gas holders, and features the ruins of a fort.

There is little written about how the island got its name. One reason could be the Portuguese missionaries, who may have named it after the Christian symbol. Or, just the fact that ships had to cross it to enter the dock area, which lies to its right.

The fort occupies almost the entire island, and was perhaps built by the Portuguese or the British settlers. There are several cannons strewn across the fort, and one very large gun. The top of the fort has a mound with a solitary large Ficus (Peepal) tree.

The island is sparsely occupied by fisher folk, although it seems to have no natural source of fresh water. At the base of the fort, some brick and mortar construction lies in dilapidated condition. This is obviously more recent as compared to the fort and seems to have been deserted by the occupants for unknown reasons.
While there is no guided tour or regular transport available to reach the island, it is possible to get such a service from local fishermen around ferry wharf for about Rs. 1000 for a 6-seater boat.

In the news 
A bomb, dating back to World War II, packed with 45 kilograms of explosives, was found at the Mumbai harbour off Cross Island by labourers of Jaisu Shipping Company, during dredging operations

January 31, 2011 - Workers discovered two gold bars (100gm and 50gm) stuck in steel plates of the dredger's hopper

In literature 
December 2021 - Four And Twenty Black Birds The Insane Life Of An English Smuggler In Bombay, a novel by Godfrey Joseph Pereira (2021) published by Speaking Tiger. Inspired by the story of an English smuggler who thrived in 20th century Bombay, an ex-journalist pens a novel that revisits a story about corruption and debauchery on a forgotten land (Cross Island), which the protagonist uses to set up a smuggling den.

References

Uninhabited islands of India
Islands of Mumbai
Islands of India
Populated places in India